is a 2011 Japanese film directed by Yuki Iwata and based on a novel by Takami Itō.

Cast
 Takayuki Yamada as Teruhiko Katayama
 Manami Konishi as Chie Sumitomo
 Yoko Maki as Shiozaki Megumi
 Chizuru Ikewaki as Wakako Suzuki
 Fumi Nikaidō

Reception
Russell Edwards of Variety criticized the film, saying: "Iwata lacks the timing needed to make this romantic comedy work."

Mark Schilling of The Japan Times said, "Iwata evidences a surreal visual flair in the early scenes especially, as in the dreamy shot of revolving shadows resolving into spinning ice skaters to injured Teruhiko's woozy eyes."

References

External links
  
 

Films directed by Yuki Iwata
Films based on Japanese novels
2010s Japanese films